Otisville is a commuter rail stop on the Metro-North Railroad's Port Jervis Line, serving the village of Otisville along with the town of Mount Hope in Orange County, New York. It is located a short distance off NY 211 near the eastern village line. The station has long been among the least developed on the Metro-North system, with a shelter on the bare concrete low-level platform but no roof, and a 104-space parking lot across the street. There is a long siding beginning just west of the station that allows trains to wait if one is coming through the tunnel. As a result, Otisville is technically a double-tracked station. When trains coming from the other direction are approaching, passengers board on the siding via a wooden platform on the tracks.

Otisville station opened on November 1, 1846 as part of the extension of the New York, Lake Erie and Western Railroad (later Erie Railroad) from Middletown, which had been the terminus since May 26, 1843. This remained the case until December 31, 1847, when service was extended to Port Jervis. The station was moved to its current location in January 1954 when the Erie realigned tracks between Howells and Graham station (in Guymard) onto the Graham Line, abandoning  of the former main line.

Station layout
The station has two tracks and a low-level side platform with a pathway connecting the platform to the bypass track.

Bibliography

References

External links 

Railfan page

Metro-North Railroad stations in New York (state)
Otisville, New York
Railway stations in Orange County, New York
NJ Transit Rail Operations stations
Railway stations in the United States opened in 1846
1846 establishments in New York (state)